Hein de Kort (born 4 October 1956, Laren) is a Dutch cartoonist. He is the winner of the 1992 Stripschapprijs.

References

1956 births
Living people
Dutch cartoonists
People from Laren, North Holland
Winners of the Stripschapsprijs
Dutch male artists
20th-century Dutch male artists